Sarah R. Palmer (born 1943) is emerita professor of maritime history at the University of Greenwich. Palmer is a specialist in commercial shipping, port development and international maritime policy from the 19th century onwards.

Selected publications
Palmer, S. (2011) The maritime world in historical perspective. International Journal of Maritime History, XXIII, pp. 1–12.
Palmer, S. (2008) British Shipping from the Late 19th Century to the Present.In: Lewis, R., Fischer and Lange, E. (eds.) International Merchant Shipping in the Nineteenth and Twentieth Centuries: the Comparative Dimension. Research in Maritime History, 37. St John's, Newfoundland.
Palmer, S. (2008) Kent and the Sea. Archaeologia Cantiana, CXXVIII, pp. 263–279.
Palmer, S. (2006) Afterword. In: Harcourt, F. Flagships of Imperialism: the P&O Company and the Politics of Empire. Manchester: Manchester University Press.
Palmer, S. (2005) Leaders and followers: the development of international maritime policy in the 19th Century. International Journal of Maritime History, XVII, pp. 1–11.
Palmer, S. (2004) The Labour Process in the 19th Century Port of London. In: Barzman, J., and Barre, E. (eds.) Environments Portuaire. Le Havre: Le Havre Press.
Palmer, S. (2003) Port economics in an historical context: the 19th century Port of London. International Journal of Maritime History, XV, pp. 27–67.
Palmer, S. (2000) Women in the War. In: Wrigley, C.J. (ed.) The International Impact of the First World War. London: Routledge.
Palmer, S. (2000) Ports 1840–1970. In: Daunton, M.J., (ed.) The Urban History of Britain 3. Cambridge University Press.
Palmer, S. (1993) Shipbuilding in Southeast England. In Ville, S. (ed.) Shipbuilding in the United Kingdom in the Nineteenth Century: A Regional Approach. St John's, Newfoundland.
Politics, Shipping and the Repeal of the Navigation Laws. Manchester, 1990.

References 

Academics of the University of Greenwich
British maritime historians
Fellows of the Royal Historical Society
British women historians
Living people
1943 births